The Batang Padang District is a district in Perak, Malaysia. This district is administered by a local council, namely, the Tapah District Council, based in Tapah. The major towns of Batang Padang are Bidor, Tapah and Sungkai.

In August 2007 the Perak Government announced the discovery of large water aquifers at Batang Padang. They plan to sell the water to neighbouring Selangor to help solve future water shortage problems in that state.

History
The sub-district of Tanjung Malim was split from this district to pave the way for Muallim District which was officiated on 11 January 2016.

Administrative divisions

Batang Padang District is divided into 4 mukims, which are:
 Batang Padang (Tapah)
 Bidor
 Chenderiang
 Sungkai

Towns and Settlements
Among the major urban settlements in Batang Padang District are:
Tapah, the district capital
Bidor
Sungkai
Chenderiang
Temoh
Tapah Road
Ayer Kuning
Banir
Sungai Lesong
Bikam

Demographics

Federal Parliament and State Assembly Seats 
List of Batang Padang district representatives in the Federal Parliament (Dewan Rakyat)

List of Batang Padang district representatives in the State Legislative Assembly of Perak

Public Transport

Train Service
There are two railway stations in Batang Padang District which are Tapah Road station and Sungkai station.

See also

 Districts of Malaysia

References